Scales, Cumbria may refer to:
Scales, near Kirkoswald, Eden district
Scales, near Threlkeld, Eden district
Scales, South Lakeland